In Norse mythology, Gungnir ("the rocking") is the spear of the god Odin.

Attestations

Poetic Edda
In the Poetic Edda poem Völuspá, the Æsir-Vanir War is described as officially starting when Odin throws a spear over the heads of an assembly of Vanir gods. Whether or not this was specifically Gungnir is, however, unstated. In Sigrdrífumál, the valkyrie Sigrdrífa advises Sigurd on the magical application of runes. She gives Sigurd advice and shares with him lore, including that runes were carved on the tip of Gungnir.

Prose Edda
According to chapter 51 of the Prose Edda book, Gylfaginning, Odin will ride in front of the Einherjar while advancing on to the battle field at Ragnarök wearing a gold helmet, an impressive cloak of mail and carrying Gungnir. He will then attack the wolf Fenrir with it.

In Skáldskaparmál, more information regarding the spear is presented. The spear was fashioned by the dwarves known as the Sons of Ivaldi under the mastery of the blacksmith dwarf Dvalin. The spear was obtained from the dwarves by Loki, the result of a scheme he concocted as a partial reparation for his cutting of the goddess Sif's hair. The spear is described as being so well balanced that it could strike any target, no matter the skill or strength of the wielder.

Archaeological record
If the rider on horseback on the image on the Böksta Runestone has been identified as Odin, then Odin is shown carrying Gungnir while hunting an elk.

In the Ring of the Nibelung
In Richard Wagner's opera cycle, Der Ring des Nibelungen, Wotan's (Odin's) spear is made from the wood of the world ash-tree and engraved with the contracts from which Wotan's power derives. He uses the spear to break the sword of Siegmund, leading to Siegmund's death. When he later tries to bar Siegmund's son Siegfried from awakening Brünnhilde from her magic sleep, Siegfried breaks the spear in two and Wotan flees. In the concluding opera Götterdämmerung Wotan is said to have returned to his stronghold Valhalla with the broken spear and withdrawn from worldly matters.

See also
 Bracteate
 Gae Bolga, the Irish legendary hero Cú Chulainn's similar magic spear
 Migration period spear
 SAAB RBS_15 Mk. IV Gungnir long-range fire-and-forget surface-to-surface and air-to-surface anti-ship missile.

Notes

References
 Orchard, Andy (1997). Dictionary of Norse Myth and Legend. Cassell.

External links 
 

Mythological Norse weapons
Odin
Spears